Lewis Toshney (born 26 April 1992) is a Scottish professional footballer and coach, who is currently playing for Downfield. Toshney has previously played for Celtic, Ross County, Cowdenbeath, Raith Rovers, Kilmarnock, Brechin City, Dundee United, Dundee, Falkirk, Inverness Caledonian Thistle and Edinburgh City. He represented Scotland at youth international levels up to and including the Scotland under-21 team.

Playing career

Celtic
Toshney made his debut for Celtic on 1 February 2011, coming on as a substitute for Scott Brown in a 3–0 league win over Aberdeen.

Kilmarnock (loan)
Toshney was loaned to Kilmarnock in January 2012. He made his debut on 7 February, in a 1–1 draw against Dunfermline in which he played the full 90 minutes. Four days later, Toshney made his second appearance, in a 1–1 draw with Hearts. His header from a corner was blocked on the line before Paul Heffernan put it in the back of the net. The next week Toshney started in his third match in a row, this time against Celtic's Old Firm rivals Rangers at Ibrox Stadium. Dean Shiels scored the only goal of the match as Kilmarnock won 1–0. Kilmarnock's next match was against Dundee United, and Toshney started again. However, after Liam Kelly received a red card, the match turned out badly for Kilmarnock who went on to concede four goals. Toshney missed Kilmarnock's next two matches due to a groin strain. After his return, manager Kenny Shiels was unsure whether to put him back on the team because he would be ineligible for the subsequent match, which was the 2012 Scottish League Cup Final, against parent club Celtic. Shiels did decide to start Toshney in the match, which was a 1–1 draw against Inverness CT Kimarnock went on to win the League Cup by beating Celtic 1–0.

Dundee (loan)
On 24 August 2012, Toshney signed for newly promoted Scottish Premier League side Dundee on a season-long loan. Toshney played regularly for the club that season, but was unable to prevent them finishing bottom and being relegated. Dundee enjoyed more success in the Scottish Cup, reaching the quarter-finals where they lost narrowly to rivals Dundee Utd. It was during this cup run though that Toshney scored his first senior goal, Dundee's second in a 5–1 win over Morton in the fifth round. The young defender was praised for his performances at Dens Park by new manager John Brown, who stated "This season has been a steep learning curve for him. He hadn't played a lot of senior football prior to coming here but he's more than proven he's of SPL quality. Lewis has a bright future in the game." Toshney returned to Celtic in the summer of 2013 after his season loan at Dundee.

Ross County
After leaving Celtic in the summer of 2014, Toshney spent time on trial at Hearts and Hibs.

On 27 September 2014, Toshney signed for Ross County and made his debut the same day as they beat Dundee 2–1.

Cowdenbeath
Having been released by Ross County, Toshney signed for Cowdenbeath on 3 February 2015, signing a contract until the end of the 2014–15 season.

Raith Rovers
On 11 June 2015, Toshney signed for Raith Rovers.

Dundee United
Following his move to Scottish Championship rivals Dundee United, former Raith Rovers manager Ray McKinnon expressed an interest in bringing Toshney to Tannadice. Raith rejected three bids from United, eventually accepting the fourth for an undisclosed five-figure fee. On 28 June 2016, Toshney signed a three-year contract with Dundee United.

Toshney suffered a knee injury in October 2017 and didn't play in the first team for the rest of the 2017–18 season. In July 2018 he joined League One team Arbroath on loan until January 2019. United boss Csaba Laszlo stated that the club had let him go on loan as he wanted to play again. However Toshney's injury reoccurred in his first match for Arbroath and the loan deal was terminated as a result. Laszlo promised that United would continue to support Toshney.

Toshney moved on loan to Brechin City in January 2019.

Brief retirement and return 
After stints with Falkirk and Inverness Caledonian Thistle, Toshney announced his retirement from playing football in April 2021. He also said that he had accepted the role as manager of Dundee-based club Downfield. He reversed his decision to retire in July 2021, and signed for Scottish League Two side Edinburgh City. In November 2021, Toshney would return to Downfield, but would do so this time as a player rather than manager.

International career
Toshney made his under-17 debut in a 3–2 loss against France in October 2008, he then played in Scotland's 3–1 victory over Slovakia, a month later. Toshney made his debut for the Scotland national under-21 football team in April 2012. Toshney scored his first goal for the Scotland under-21s in a 3–0 win versus Luxembourg on 25 March 2013 to make the game 3–0.

Career statistics

Honours
Dundee United
 Scottish Challenge Cup: 2016–17

References

1992 births
Association football central defenders
Celtic F.C. players
Dundee F.C. players
Kilmarnock F.C. players
Ross County F.C. players
Cowdenbeath F.C. players
Raith Rovers F.C. players
Dundee United F.C. players
Living people
Scotland under-21 international footballers
Scotland youth international footballers
Scottish footballers
Scottish Premier League players
Scottish Professional Football League players
Footballers from Dundee
Arbroath F.C. players
Brechin City F.C. players
Falkirk F.C. players
Inverness Caledonian Thistle F.C. players
Downfield F.C. managers
Scottish football managers
F.C. Edinburgh players
Downfield F.C. players